Domino (1891–1897) was a 19th-century American thoroughbred race horse.

Background
A dark brown, almost black, colt, Domino was sired by Himyar out of the mare Mannie Gray. Sam Hildreth writes in his book The Spell of the Turf that the colt looked black but was actually a deep chestnut.  Himyar was out of speed horse Alarm who'd inherited this speed from the great Eclipse. Domino, who also inherited that speed, was foaled at Major Barak Thomas's Dixiana Farm in Lexington, Kentucky. What he did not have was stamina.

Owned by James R. Keene, he was purchased as a yearling for $3,000 by his son, Foxhall Keene. Domino was trained by William Lakeland and ridden by jockey Fred Taral, whom Domino hated for his rough style and copious use of whip and spur.

Racing career

1893: two-year-old season
At the age of two, he won the Great Eclipse Stakes, the Great American Stakes, the Great Trial Stakes, the Hyde Park Stakes, the Matron Stakes, the Monmouth Park Produce Stakes, and the prestigious Futurity Stakes.

The Futurity Stakes marked the beginning of Domino's hatred for Taral. During the running, Domino's stablemate fell, and Domino, trying to avoid him, nearly went down as well. Taral whipped Domino mercilessly as a result, and then, when a colt named Dobbins challenged him, Taral went for the whip again. A newspaper article, while dramatic, described the race as follows:"Once, twice, thrice, the lash descended on Domino's quivering flanks, but still Dobbins crept nearer and nearer...A furlong from home Dobbins' muzzle showed ahead. Taral shifted his whip from his right to his left hand and played a tattoo on Domino's ribs that could be heard half a mile away. His heels were busy, and Domino's sides ran blood...The game colt that had never known defeat, struggled on, and 100 yards from the finish there was not a man alive capable of predicting the winner."By now, people called him "The Black Whirlwind".  About this time heats no longer dominated horse races in America (they'd fallen out of favor in England decades earlier), and speed was becoming a premium.  Domino was considered the fastest sprinter of his time.

1894: three-year-old season
In his first start at age three in the Withers Stakes, Domino defeated the Belmont Stakes champion Henry of Navarre, and went on to win five of the next seven races he entered including a dead heat with arch rival Henry of Navarre in a match race sometimes referred to as the Third Special. As such, they met again three weeks later in a race to determine the 1894 championship. For this event, the 4-year-old Clifford joined the two younger colts. This time, Henry of Navarre won by 3/4's of a length, earning Horse of the Year honors.

At three, besides the Withers, he won the Culver and Ocean Handicaps plus the Flying Handicap in which he carried 130 pounds while setting a new track record.

1895: four-year-old season
Raced as a four-year-old, Domino won four of eight races: the Coney Island Handicap, the Sheepshead Bay Handicap, and came in 2nd in the Fall Handicap carrying 133 lb., conceding 24 lb to the winner.

Slightly unsound, and always raced in bandages, in his 25 starts, Domino won 19, placed in 2, and came third in one.  His life career earnings amounted to $193,550.

Eventually refusing to train due to a bad foot, at the end of the 1895 season, he was retired to Castleton Stud.

Stud career
Domino had produced only twenty foals when at age six (July 29, 1897) he died unexpectedly of spinal meningitis. However, this diagnosis is still disputed today. Known for being a gentle, but playful horse, Domino would rear and paw the air upon being turned out in his paddock, lending credibility to the claim that he slipped and fell, thus breaking his neck.  Despite his short time as a sire, of Domino's twenty foals eight were stakes race winners, an incredible 42% rate versus the industry norm of just 3%.  (Only four colts were not gelded.)  Included among them was Cap and Bells, the first American-bred to win the Epsom Oaks, and Belmont Stakes winner and two-time Horse of the Year Commando, who in turn sired a number of top horses one of whom was hall of famer, Colin.  Today, many thoroughbred race horses trace their lineage to Domino.  Some of his most famous descendants were War Admiral, Personal Ensign, Buckpasser, Zenyatta, Secretariat, Seattle Slew, Affirmed, Bold Ruler, Assault, Whirlaway, Gallant Fox, Omaha, Native Dancer, American Pharoah, and Justify.  Ten of the 13 Triple Crown winners have Domino in their pedigree.

Honors
Domino was one of the first handful of horses inducted into the National Museum of Racing and Hall of Fame in 1955.  His owner had his headstone engraved: "Here lies the fleetest runner the American turf has ever known, and the gamest and most generous of horses."

Pedigree

References

1891 racehorse births
1897 racehorse deaths
Racehorses bred in Kentucky
Racehorses trained in the United States
Horse racing track record setters
American Thoroughbred Horse of the Year
United States Thoroughbred Racing Hall of Fame inductees
United States Champion Thoroughbred Sires
Horse monuments
Thoroughbred family 23-b